Budu is a Southern Loloish language of Yunnan, China. Budu is spoken in Jiangcheng Hani and Yi Autonomous County, Mojiang Hani Autonomous County, Zhenyuan Yi, Hani and Lahu Autonomous County, and Yuanjiang Hani, Yi and Dai Autonomous County.

Many Budu born after c. 1970 are unable to speak the language.

References

You Weiqiong [尤伟琼]. 2013. Classifying ethnic groups of Yunnan [云南民族识别研究]. Beijing: Nationalities Press [民族出版社].

Southern Loloish languages
Languages of Yunnan